The International University of Professional Studies is an unaccredited, distance education school located in Maui, Hawaii. The school offers Masters and Doctoral level degrees in a variety of topics, including psychology and spirituality.

References 

Private universities and colleges in Hawaii
Buildings and structures in Maui County, Hawaii
Education in Maui County, Hawaii